The Chief Minister of Galmudug was the head of government of Galmudug state of Somalia located in central Somalia. According to the 14-point power-sharing agreement between Galmudug and Ahlu Sunna Waljama'a, the Chief Minister will preside over the state cabinet sessions but won't have the power to appoint or sack ministers. The President will appoint the state ministers then forward it to the chief minister who will then present the names to the state assembly. The agreement also gives the president powers to sack the chief minister.

List of chief ministers of Galmudug

See also
Somalia
Politics of Somalia
Lists of office-holders
List of current heads of state and government

References

Galmudug
Government of Somalia